Matt Myers is an American baseball coach and former pitcher who is the current pitching coach for the Lipscomb Bisons. He served as the head coach of UNC Asheville Bulldogs (2001–2004) and Western Kentucky (2012–2015).  He currently serves as Pitching Coach at UNC Wilmington.

Playing career
Myers played one season each at Sacramento State and Sacramento City before completing his college career at Tennessee.  His 13–4 record gives him one of the top 10 winning percentages in Volunteer history.

Coaching career
After completing his degree in 1998, Myers served as a graduate assistant at Tennessee for the 1999 season.  He also completed a master's degree in that year.  He then earned a position as a full-time assistant coach at UNC Asheville for the 2000 season, and was elevated to head coach the following year.  He helped rebuild a struggling program, leading the Bulldogs to the top half of the Big South Conference as one of the youngest coaches in Division I.  He earned Big South Conference Coach of the Year honors in 2003 and a 4th-place finish.  He then moved to Auburn as an assistant for three seasons.  His pitching staff ranked among the program's best in his three years in ERA and also recorded strong results in saves and walks.  In June 2007, Myers moved to WKU, and added associate head coach duties two years later.  He was named head coach prior to the 2012 season.  In four seasons, Myers's teams failed to reach the 30-win mark or finish better than 16-14 in conference play, and he was fired at the end of the 2015 season. After a three-season stint as head coach at Bowling Green High School in Bowling Green, Kentucky, Myers was hired as an assistant at UNC Wilmington following the 2018 season. In January of 2022, Lipscomb University announced the hiring of Myers as their pitching coach.

Head coaching record
The following table shows Myers' record as a head coach.

References

Living people
Baseball pitchers
Sportspeople from Sacramento County, California
Auburn Tigers baseball coaches
Sacramento City Panthers baseball players
Sacramento State Hornets baseball players
Tennessee Volunteers baseball coaches
Tennessee Volunteers baseball players
UNC Asheville Bulldogs baseball coaches
Western Kentucky Hilltoppers baseball coaches
People from Carmichael, California
UNC Wilmington Seahawks baseball coaches
Year of birth missing (living people)
Lipscomb Bisons baseball coaches